Jeff Teichert is a prominent American lawyer in the areas of constitutional law, appellate litigation, natural resources litigation, property rights, and business litigation.

Background 

Teichert was born in Provo, Utah.  After moving with his family to various areas throughout the United States, he spent his childhood beyond the fifth grade in Orem, Utah, and graduated from Orem High School where he was a state champion in Lincoln-Douglas Debate. Throughout his teen years, Teichert spent summers working at his family cattle ranch near Cokeville, Wyoming.  After graduating from high school, Teichert attended Southern Utah State College for one year on a speech and debate scholarship.  Teichert then served for two years as a missionary for the Church of Jesus Christ of Latter-day Saints in Queensland, Australia.  Teichert earned his undergraduate degree at Brigham Young University.

Legal career 
Teichert earned his Juris Doctor degree at Brigham Young University in 1994. During law school Teichert served as a Senior Editor for the BYU Journal of Public Law and as Student Ombudsman.  After graduating from law school, Teichert served for two years as a judicial law clerk to Chief Justice F. Michael Kruse and Associate Justice Lyle L. Richmond of the High Court of American Samoa.  Teichert later practiced law as a Senior Associate at Budd-Falen Law Offices and participated in a number of high-profile public lands cases, including filing briefs in the United States Court of Appeals for the Tenth Circuit and the United States Supreme Court in Public Lands Council v. Babbitt.

In 1999, Teichert entered The George Washington University Law School to pursue a Master of Laws (LLM) emphasizing English and early American legal history and environmental law, eventually graduating "with highest honors."

In 2001, Teichert founded Teichert Law Office, PC, in Bellingham, Washington.  His work included filing a brief on the winning side in the landmark United States Supreme Court case District of Columbia v. Heller, which interpreted the Second Amendment of the United States Constitution as protecting an individual right to keep and bear arms.

In 2006, Teichert was a candidate for the Washington Court of Appeals, earning the endorsements former United States Senator and state Attorney General Slade Gorton, state Supreme Court Justice James M. Johnson, state legislators, County Sheriffs, and other prominent citizens and organizations.  Teichert received over 29,000 votes but was defeated by incumbent Judge Mary Kay Becker. Teichert served as a member of the Blaine, Washington City Planning Commission from 2008 to 2010.

Teichert founded Teichert Law Office, PLLC in Provo, Utah in 2016. In 2021,Teichert was appointed Assistant Attorney General for the State of Utah for constitutional defense and special litigation.

Other 

In 2020,Jeff Teichert and his wife, Cathy Butler Teichert, founded Love in Later Years, an organization that supports middle-aged singles and later-married couples. In 2021, Jeff and Cathy published the Amazon bestseller, "Intentional Courtship:a mid-singles guide to peace, progress and pairing up in the Church of Jesus Christ of Latter-day Saints."

Jeff and Cathy are the parents of a blended family with four sons.

References 

Living people
Year of birth missing (living people)